A list of films produced in Argentina in 2009:

See also
2009 in Argentina

External links
 Argentine films of 2009 at the Internet Movie Database
 Argentine films and box office of 2009 (Spanish)

Films
Lists of 2009 films by country or language
2009